Bilateral foreign relations exist between  Austria and Israel.

History
Austria recognized Israel on March 5, 1949. Austria has an embassy in Tel Aviv and 3 honorary consulates (in Eilat, Haifa and Jerusalem). Israel has an embassy in Vienna. Both countries are full members of the Union for the Mediterranean. The Austrian Foreign Ministry lists the bilateral treaties with Israel (in German only).

In 2000, after the Freedom Party of Austria joined the coalition government, Israel recalled its ambassador. After talks in Jerusalem with the Austrian foreign minister, Benita Ferrero-Waldner in 2003, relations were restored.

Ambassadors of Israel to Austria
 Zvi Heifetz
 Aviv Shir-On
 Dan Ashbel
 Avigdor Dagan
 Natan Peled

Diplomacy

Republic of Austria
Tel Aviv (Embassy)

State of Israel
Vienna (Embassy)

See also 
 Foreign relations of Austria 
 Foreign relations of Israel 
 International recognition of Israel
 History of the Jews in Austria
 History of the Jews in Vienna
 Jewish Museum Vienna
 Anschluss

References

External links
  Austria Foreign Ministry: list of bilateral treaties with Israel (in German only)
  Austrian embassy in Tel Aviv
  Israeli embassy in Vienna (in German only)

 
Israel
Bilateral relations of Israel